Zilla diodia is an orb-weaver spider species found from Europe to Azerbaijan. This species was originally described by Charles Athanase Walckenaer in 1802 as Aranea diodia.

Webs 
Zilla diodia build very fine, vertical orb webs with often more than 50 radii and sticky spiral loops. The radii in the webs of this species – unlike those in most other orb webs – are double stranded at the periphery of the web and single stranded near the centre, presumably as an adaptation to the different forces acting on the inner and outer part of the radii.

See also 
 List of Araneidae species: N–Z

References

External links 

Araneidae
Spiders of Europe
Spiders of Asia
Fauna of Azerbaijan
Spiders described in 1802
Taxa named by Charles Athanase Walckenaer